Palangos Kuršiai is a professional basketball club based in Palanga, Lithuania currently playing in the National Basketball League.

Current roster

References

External links
 Official website of BC Kuršiai
 BC Palanga NKLyga.lt

Basketball teams in Lithuania
Sport in Palanga
Basketball teams established in 2018
2018 establishments in Lithuania